Cayetano Simplicio Arellano y Lonzón (March 2, 1847 – December 23, 1920) was the first Chief Justice of the Supreme Court of the Philippines under the American Civil Government. Cayetano Arellano had occupied a high position in Aguinaldo's government. He worked with the Americans under General Otis and re-established the Audiencia Territorial as the Supreme Court. He served as Chief Justice from 1901 until his retirement on April 12, 1920, making him the longest to serve as chief justice in Philippine history.

Early life

Don Cayetano was born in Udyong (now  Orion), Bataan to Servando Arellano, a working Spaniard and Crispora Lonzón, a meeting in Bataan. He started as a working student in Colegio de San Juan de Letran. After finishing his high school he transferred to University of Santo Tomas, where he finished his Bachelor of Philosophy in 1862 and Bachelor of Theology in 1867, he then continued studying and finished law in 1876. During the Spanish regime, he was appointed as a Magistrado Suplente of the Audiencia Tribunal de Manila. He later become the Chief Justice of the Provisional Supreme Court created by the military in 1899.

Arellano, together with Pedro Paterno, Benito Legarda, Florentino Torres and Felipe Buencamino, testified before the Schurman Commission that the Philippines was not yet ready for self-rule. Together they formed the Federal Party to "promote the annexation of the Philippines as a state". In lieu of this objective, they petitioned the U.S. Congress to create representation, as well as a Philippine Congress and a federal Court.

Upon the onset of the American civil government in 1901, US President William McKinley appointed Arellano as the first Supreme Court Chief Justice.

Personal life
Arellano was married to Doña Rosa Bernas. They had a daughter named Asunción Arellano y Berna.

Death and legacy
He died on December 23, 1920 at the age of 73. He was buried at La Loma Catholic Cemetery in the city of Caloocan, Metro Manila.

Images

See also
Arellano (Manila North) High School
Arellano University

References

 Cruz, Isagani A. (2000). Res Gestae: A Brief History of the Supreme Court. Rex Book Store, Manila

External links
 Supreme Court of the Philippines - Cayetano Arellano biodata
 Arellano University

1847 births
1920 deaths
People from Bataan
Colegio de San Juan de Letran alumni
Chief justices of the Supreme Court of the Philippines
Filipino people of Kapampangan descent
University of Santo Tomas alumni
Burials at La Loma Cemetery